Rabun Bald, with an elevation of , is the second-highest peak in the U.S. state of Georgia; only Brasstown Bald  is higher. It is immediately southeast of Sky Valley, Georgia, and is the tallest mountain in the county. The hike to the top of Rabun Bald is  round trip via the Rabun Bald Trail.

According to Native American legend, Rabun Bald is inhabited by fire-breathing demon people: some campers still report hearing strange sounds throughout the night.

Rabun Bald was the site of the first fire tower in the area, which was constructed by Nick Nicholson, the first forest ranger in Georgia. The fire tower was operated by the United States Forest Service until the early 1970s. After the fire tower was taken out of service, a Youth Conservation Corps (YCC) crew dismantled the tower's uppermost component, a metal-framed enclosure with glass windows that sat atop a stone base. Leaving the stone base intact, the YCC crew replaced the metal "cabin" with a railed wooden observation platform.

Gallery

See also
List of mountains in Georgia (U.S. state)

References

External links 

 TopoQuest map of Rabun Bald
 Hiking Rabun Bald
 Rabun Bald Hike
 Sherpa Guide for Rabun Bald

Mountains of Georgia (U.S. state)
Protected areas of Rabun County, Georgia
Appalachian balds
Mountains of Rabun County, Georgia